The Bishop of Tonbridge is an episcopal title used by a suffragan bishop of the Church of England Diocese of Rochester in the Province of Canterbury, England. The title takes its name after Tonbridge, a market town in Kent; the see was erected under the Suffragans Nomination Act 1888 by Order in Council dated 11 September 1958. The bishop assists the diocesan Bishop of Rochester as well as having a particular ministry in the Archdeaconry of Tonbridge.

The current bishop is Simon Burton-Jones, since his consecration on 3 July 2018.

List of bishops

References

External links
 Crockford's Clerical Directory - Listings

Bishops of Tonbridge
Anglican suffragan bishops in the Diocese of Rochester